The Sajik Arena is an indoor sporting arena located in Busan, South Korea. The seating capacity of the arena is 14,099 and was built in 1985. Until 2021, it was the home arena of the Busan KT Sonicboom basketball team. After Busan KT Sonicboom left the arena, the arena became the home arena of the Busan BNK Sum women's basketball team.

Events
 2012: American pop rock band Maroon 5's first concert of the third Korean tour, a part of Overexposed Tour.
 2nd Asia Song Festival, organised by Korea Foundation for International Culture Exchange, in 2005.
 JYJ: JYJ Worldwide Concert – 11 and 12 June 2011

See also
 List of indoor arenas in South Korea

References

External links 
Busan Sports Complex

Sports venues in Busan
Indoor arenas in South Korea
Basketball venues in South Korea
Suwon KT Sonicboom
Sports venues completed in 1985
1985 establishments in South Korea
20th-century architecture in South Korea